De Carthage à Carthage is a Tunisian 2009 documentary film.

Synopsis 
Khaled Barsaoui's documentary on the Carthage Cinema Days asks questions about the future of the Festival and the definition of its identity.

External links 

2009 films
Tunisian documentary films
2009 short documentary films
Documentary films about African cinema